The Inuit are a group of indigenous peoples living in the most northern parts of North America.

Inuit may also refer to:
Inuit languages, a language family spoken in the North American Arctic
Inuit culture, various groups of indigenous peoples in the North American Arctic
Northern Inuit Dog, a breed of dog
Saturn's Inuit group of satellites, satellites of Saturn

Language and nationality disambiguation pages